Beast of Burden may refer to:

 Pack animal
 Working animal
 "Beast of Burden" (song), by The Rolling Stones
 Beast of Burden (film), a 2018 American film
 "Beast of Burden" (Stargate SG-1), a television episode
 Beast of Burden (miniature), a line of miniatures for the game Traveller
 Beasts of Burden, a comic book miniseries by Evan Dorkin and Jill Thompson